The Three Crowns Hotel, also Three Crowns Chagford, is a historical hotel in Chagford, Devon, England. The hotel, noted for its granite facade and 13th century features, has 21 rooms.

The oldest block of the building dates to late 16th century. The building has been extended several times over the years. It was a manor house for centuries before becoming an inn (formerly called Black Swan). It is a Grade II* listed building.

References

External links
Official site

Buildings and structures completed in the 13th century
Hotels in Devon
Houses in Devon
Grade II* listed buildings in Devon
Hotel buildings completed in the 16th century
Grade II* listed pubs in Devon